William Sheppard (c. 1906 – 27 December 1950) was an English professional footballer. He was capable of playing as both an inside and outside forward.

Career 
Born in Ferryhill, County Durham, Sheppard started his career as an amateur in County Durham, before joining Liverpool in 1926. He signed as a professional for Watford in 1927, who at the time were playing in the Football League Third Division South. In the 1927–28 season—his first at Watford—Sheppard scored 25 goals in all competitions, finishing as the club's top scorer. After 39 goals in 95 Watford games, he joined QPR on a free transfer in 1930, and moved to Coventry City the following year.

Sheppard joined Walsall in January 1933, and one of his first games for the club was an FA Cup Third Round tie against Arsenal at Fellows Park, in front of 11,150 spectators. At the time Arsenal were competing for the First Division title, which they eventually won. Walsall were in the Third Division North. Sheppard played the game at inside right. After a goalless first half, Walsall centre-forward Gilbert Alsop scored the opening goal with a header in the second half. Five minutes later Alsop won a penalty kick, which Sheppard converted to double the team's lead. Arsenal were unable to overturn the deficit; Walsall won the match 2–0.

He remained at Walsall until the end of the 1933–34 season. He briefly joined Chester, but returned to Walsall in October of that year, before leaving permanently in June 1935. Season 1935–36 saw him at Tunbridge Wells Rangers in the Southern League.

Sheppard died in Hemel Hempstead, Hertfordshire, during a Christmas celebration.

References

1900s births
People from Ferryhill
Footballers from County Durham
1950 deaths
Liverpool F.C. players
Watford F.C. players
Queens Park Rangers F.C. players
Coventry City F.C. players
Walsall F.C. players
Chester City F.C. players
Crook Town A.F.C. players
English Football League players
Tunbridge Wells F.C. players
Ferryhill Athletic F.C. players
Association football forwards
English footballers